Žeteoci (trans. The Harvesters) were a Yugoslav rock band formed in Zagreb in 1966. Founded by four students of the Zagreb Catholic Faculty of Theology, Žeteoci performed beat music with religious lyrics, being the first Christian rock band in Yugoslavia, arguably the first Christian rock band in a communist country and one of the first Christian rock bands in general. Although they were not among the earliest Yugoslav rock bands, Žeteoci, as other 1960s rock bands from Yugoslavia, played a pioneering roll on the Yugoslav rock scene. Their first and only album, To nije tajna, released in 1969, was the second full-length album in the history of Yugoslav rock music.

Although an openly religious band in a communist state, due to specific political and cultural milieu of the Non-Aligned Yugoslavia, for the most of their career Žeteoci enjoyed the attention of the media and notable popularity among the Yugoslav youth. Their only album was released in cooperation between Glas Koncila (Voice of the Council), the official newspaper of the Catholic Church in Croatia, and state-owned record label Jugoton. They ended their activiy in 1971, as the members of the band finished their studies of theology and went on to become priests of the Catholic Church.

History

1966–1971
The band was formed in the autumn of 1966 by Mijo Bergovec, Mato Dukić, Mijo Gabrić and Josip Pustički and was initially named Bijeli Kolari (White Wheelwrights). At the time of the formation, all four members were students of the Zagreb Catholic Faculty of Theology. Initially the four performed only among the friends, with Dukić singing and other three playing guitars, and had their first public appearance in 1967, when they appeared in Television Belgrade show Koncert za ludi mladi svet (A Concert for Young Crazy World).

By 1968 the band acquired all the necessary equipment—with their first electric guitar being a gift from Cardinal Franjo Šeper—performing in the following lineup: Mijo Bergovec (vocals, guitar, organ), Mato Dukić (vocals, bass guitar), Valent Bogadi (guitar) and Mijo Gabrić (drums). This lineup had their first public performance on 3 February 1969, in the Iskra Hall in Zagreb. The band performed beat music with religious lyrics, so the Yugoslav press nicknamed them "električari u haljama" ("electric musicians in robes"). Their repertoire also included compositions by French singer-songwriter and Jesuit Aimé Duval, in their own arrangements and with Serbo-Croatian lyrics, and other spiritual songs.

Soon after the performance in the Iskra Hall, because of the large interest of the audience, Žeteoci scheduled a performance in Zagreb's Students' Cultural Center. However, the performance was banned by the communist authorities just before the beginning of the concert, which caused the dissatisfaction of the gathered crowd and thus the reaction by the police. A week later the band was allowed to hold a concert, but after the performance they decided to continue performing live abroad only. During the following years the band held a number of concerts across Austria, Italy, Switzerland, United States of America and Canada. On their concerts abroad they performed, besides their religious songs, covers of traditional songs from Yugoslavia and current pop hits.

At the beginning of 1969 the band released their only studio album, entitled To nije tajna (It Is Not a Secret). To nije tajna was released only two months after the first full-length album in the history of Yugoslav rock music, Naši dani (Our Days) by Grupa 220, thus becoming the second full-length album in Yugoslav rock history. The album was produced by Pero Gotovac and released in cooperation between Glas Koncila (Voice of the Council), the official newspaper of the Catholic Church in Croatia, and state-owned record label Jugoton. It featured rock sound as well as pop and gospel songs. The album was sold in churches, with the initial number of 10,000 copies sold out until the end of the year. It was reissued two more times in the following period, with different album covers, thus becoming both the best-selling record of religious music in Yugoslavia and a collector's item. The album saw positive reviews in the Yugoslav music press. In 1970 the band made another appearance in the Koncert za mladi ludi svet TV show, performing the song "Rumeno nebo" ("Ruddy Sky"), originally written by Aimé Duval.

Two years after the album release, the band released the 7-inch single with the songs "Majka Marija" ("Mother Mary") and "Bistrička" ("Bistrica Song"), for which the music was composed by singer-sonwriter Arsen Dedić. Soon after, as the members of the band had finished their studies, they disbanded to become priests.

Post breakup
After Žeteoci ended their activity, all the members of the band became catholic priests, with the exception of Bergovac, who his quit his studies of theology in the fifth year of the Faculty. He graduated from the Zagreb School of Medicine, later working as a physician. Valent Bogati was a parish priest in Grubišno Polje, Mato Dukić was a parish priest in Velika Pisanica, and Mijo Gabrić was an editor in Glas koncila and in the catholic newspaper for children Mali koncil (Little Council).

The band's song "Tmina" ("Darkness") was published on the box set Kad je rock bio mlad – Priče sa istočne strane (1956–1970) (When Rock Was Young – East Side Stories (1956–1970)), released by Croatia Records in 2005 and featuring songs by the pioneering Yugoslav rock acts.

Discography

Studio albums
To nije tajna (1969)

Singles
"Majka Marija" / "Bistrička" (1971)

References

External links 
Žeteoci at Discogs

Croatian rock music groups
Yugoslav rock music groups
Beat groups
Christian rock groups
Musical groups established in 1966
Musical groups disestablished in 1971
1966 establishments in Yugoslavia